The Qutb Minar, also spelled Qutub Minar and Qutab Minar, is a minaret and "victory tower" that forms part of the Qutb complex, which lies at the site of Delhi’s oldest fortified city, Lal Kot, founded by the Tomar Rajputs. It is a UNESCO World Heritage Site in the Mehrauli area of South Delhi, India. It is one of the most visited tourist spots in the city, mostly built between 1199 and 1220.

The surfaces of both are elaborately decorated with inscriptions and geometric patterns. The Qutb Minar has a shaft that is fluted with "superb stalactite bracketing under the balconies" at the top of each stage. In general, minarets were slow to be used in India and are often detached from the main mosque where they exist.

A Synthesis of South Asian and Islamic Architecture 
This victory tower is a symbol of the synthesis of traditional Islamic architecture and Southwestern Asian design. Elizabeth Lambourn’s Islam Beyond Empires: Mosques and Islamic Landscapes in India and the Indian Ocean studies the introduction of Islam in South Asia and how the region influenced the Islamic religious architecture. These newly arrived Muslims from the Islamic West escaped the Mongol Empire and emigrated to India, where they constructed religious centers. The Qutb Minar serves as a central marker to these new Muslim communities as well as being a reminder of Islam's presence in the area. The architecture of the minaret varies greatly from that of the typical style and design of the mosques constructed in the Middle East. The style of these structures is heavily influenced by the local architecture such as the Indic temples. This affected the different materials, techniques, and decoration that were used in the construction of the Qutb Minar.

The minaret is unique in that historically, these tower minarets were uncommon in South Asian-Islamic design until the 17th century. This lag is due to the slow adoption of the typical Middle Eastern style in India. It is also detached from the main mosque, showcasing how the native culture affected the design of a Middle Eastern structure. The Qutb Minar is seen as the "earliest and best example of a fusion or synthesis of Hindu-Muslim traditions" according to Ved Parkash in his essay The Qutb Minar from Contemporary and Near Contemporary Sources. Like many mosques built in South Asia during this time period, the minaret was constructed by Hindu laborers and craftsmen but overseen by Muslim architects. This led to a construction that synthesized both Hindu and Islamic religious architecture. Since the craftsmen were Hindu and unfamiliar with the Quran, the inscriptions are a compilation of disarranged Quranic texts and other Arabic expressions.

History
The Qutb Minar was built over the ruins of the Lal Kot, the citadel of Dhillika. Qutub Minar was begun after the Quwwat-ul-Islam Mosque. Drawing references from their Ghurid homeland, Qutub-ud-Din Aibak and Shamsu’d-Din Iltutmish constructed a minar (minaret) at the south-eastern corner of the Quwwatu’l-Islam between 1199 and 1503.    It is usually thought that the tower is named for Qutb-ud-din Aibak, who began it. It is also possible that it is named after Khwaja Qutbuddin Bakhtiar Kaki a 13th-century sufi saint, because Shamsuddin Iltutmish was a devotee of his.

The Minar is surrounded by several historically significant monuments of the Qutb complex. Quwwat-ul-Islam Mosque, to the north-east of the Minar was built by Qutub-ud-Din Aibak in A.D. 1199. It is the earliest extant - mosque built by the Delhi Sultans. It consists of a rectangular courtyard enclosed by cloisters, erected with the carved columns and architectural members of 27 Jain and Hindu temples, which were demolished by Qutub-ud-Din Aibak as recorded in his inscription on the main eastern entrance. Later, a lofty arched screen was erected, and the mosque was enlarged, by Shams-ud- Din Itutmish (A.D. 1210-35) and Ala-ud-Din Khalji. The Iron Pillar in the courtyard bears an inscription in Sanskrit in Brahmi script of fourth century A.D., according to which the pillar was set up as a Vishnudhvaja (standard of god Vishnu) on the hill known as Vishnupada in memory of a mighty king named Chandra.

The mosque complex is one of the earliest that survives in the Indian subcontinent.

The nearby pillared cupola known as "Smith's Folly" is a remnant of the tower's 19th century restoration, which included an ill-advised attempt to add some more stories.

In 1505, an earthquake damaged Qutub Minar; it was repaired by Sikander Lodi. On 1 September 1803, a major earthquake caused serious damage. Major Robert Smith of the British Indian Army renovated the tower in 1828 and installed a pillared cupola over the fifth story, creating a sixth. The cupola was taken down in 1848, under instructions from The Viscount Hardinge, who was the Governor General of India. at the time. It was reinstalled at ground level to the east of Qutb Minar, where it remains. This is known as "Smith's Folly".

It was added to the list of World Heritage Site by UNESCO in 1993.

The Ghurids 

The construction of the Qutb Minar was planned and financed by the Ghurids, who emigrated to India and brought Islam with them. The Ghurids, historically known as the Shansabanis, were a clan of Tajik origin that hailed from Ghur, the mountainous region of modern-day western Afghanistan. In the late eleventh century to the early twelfth century, the different sects of this nomadic clan united, losing its nomadic culture. During this time, they also converted to Islam.

They then expanded into modern-day India and quickly took control of a substantial part of the country. The Ghurids annexed the Multan and Uch in the western Punjab in 1175-76, the northwestern regions around Peshawar in 1177, and the region of Sindh in 1185-86. In 1193, Qutb al-Din Aibek conquered Delhi and implemented a Ghurid governorship in the province, and the congregational mosque, the Qutb Minar complex, was founded in 1193. In the past, scholars believed that the complex was constructed to promote a conversion to Islam amongst the Ghurids' new subjects as well as a symbol of the Ghurids' adherence to a socio-religious system. There is now new information to suggest that conversion to Islam was not a top priority of the new annexes and instead the Ghurid governors sought to make a synthesis of the local culture and Islam through negotiation.

The Patrons and Architects 
Qutb-ud-din Aibak, a deputy of Muhammad of Ghor, who founded the Delhi Sultanate after Muhammad of Ghor's death, started construction of the Qutb Minar's first story in 1199. Aibak's successor and son-in-law Shamsuddin Iltutmish completed a further three stories. After a lightning strike in 1369 damaged the then top story, the ruler at the time, Firuz Shah Tughlaq, replaced the damaged story and added one more. Sher Shah Suri also added an entrance while he was ruling and the Mughal emperor Humayun was in exile.

Architecture

Pesrian-Arabic and Nagari in different sections of the Qutb Minar reveal the history of its construction and the later restorations and repairs by Firoz Shah Tughluq (1351–88) and Sikandar Lodi (1489–1517).

The height of Qutb Minar is 72.5 meters, making it the tallest minaret in the world built of bricks. The tower tapers, and has a 14.3 metres (47 feet) base diameter, reducing to 2.7 metres (9 feet) at the top of the peak. It contains a spiral staircase of 379 steps.

The whole tower contains a spiral staircase of 379 steps. At the foot of the tower is the Quwat Ul Islam Mosque. The Minar tilts just over 65 cm from the vertical, which is considered to be within safe limits.

Qutb Minar was an inspiration and prototype for many minarets and towers built. The Chand Minar and Mini Qutub Minar bear resemblance to the Qutb Minar and inspired from it.

The Stories of the Qutb Minar 
The stories of the Qutb Minar vary in size, style, and material due to varying architects and builders constructing each section.

The Basement Story of the Qutb Minar 
The Qutb Minar consists of five stories of red and grey sandstone. The lowest story, also known as the basement story, was completed during the lifetime of Ghiyeth al-Din Muhammad, a sultan during the Ghurid dynasty.

It is revetted with twelve semicircular and twelve flanged pilasters that are placed in alternating order. This story is separated by flanges and by storied balconies, carried on Muqarnas corbels. The story is placed on top of a low circular plinth that is inscribed with a twelve-pointed star with a semicircle placed with each of the angles between the star’s points.

There are also six horizontal bands with inscriptions inscribed in naskh, a style of Islamic calligraphy, on this story. The inscriptions are as follows: Quran, sura II, verses 255-60; Quran, sura LIX, verses 22-23, and attributes of God; The name and titles of Ghiyath al-Din; Quran, sura XLVIII, verses 1-6; The name and titles of Mu’izz al-Din; and Qur’anic quotations and the following titles in this much restored inscription: "The Amir, the most glorious and great commander of the army." This level also has inscriptions praising Muhammad of Ghor, the sultan of the Ghurids.

The Second, Third, and Fourth Stories 
The second, third, and fourth stories were erected by Sham ud-Din Iltutmish, the first Muslim sovereign to rule from Delhi. He is considered to be the first of the Delhi Sultan dynastic line. The second and third stories are also revetted with twelve semicircular and twelve flanged pilasters that are placed in alternating order. These red sandstone columns are separated by flanges and by storied balconies, carried on Muqarnas corbels. Prior to its reconstruction and reduction, the fourth story was also decorated with semicircular pilasters. It was re-constructed in white marble and is relatively plain.

The Fifth Story 
In 1369, the fourth story was repaired after lightning struck the minaret. During reconstruction, Sultan Firuz Shah Tughlaq elected to reduce the size of the fourth story and then separated it into two stories.

Controversy 

On 14 November 2000, Delhi newspapers reported that the Hindu nationalist groups, Vishva Hindu Parishad and Bajrang Dal, planned to host a yajna, a ritualistic Hindu ceremony related to cleansing or purification, at the Qutub Minar complex where the minaret is located. The Delhi police detained 80 activists led by Ram Krishan Gaur that were located by the Qutb Minar and were stopped from performing the yajna inside the tower. Due to a police barricade, the activists instead performed the ritual on the streets outside the mosque complex. Since the spolia of Jain and Hindu temples were used to construct the minaret, the right-wing Hindu groups believed that they needed to perform a cleansing at the complex in order to free the Hindu icons that were "trapped" in the minaret and the mosque complex.

On 18 May 2022, a former Regional Director of Archaeological Survey of India, Dharamveer Sharma, has claimed that Qutb Minar was built by Raja Vikramaditya in the fifth century to observe the changing position of the sun.

On 21 May 2022, The Secretary at the Ministry of Culture, Govind Mohan, took the decision to conduct excavation and iconography of idols found at Qutub Minar. The Ministry has now asked the ASI to submit an excavation report. Excavation can be started in the south of the minaret at a distance of 15 meters from the mosque.

Accidents

Before 1976, the general public was allowed access to the first floor of the minaret, via the internal staircase. Access to the top was stopped after 2000 due to suicides. On 4 December 1981, the staircase lighting failed. Between 300 and 400 visitors stampeded towards the exit. 45 were killed and some were injured. Most of these were school 
children. Since then, the tower has been closed to the public. Since this incident the rules regarding entry have been stringent.

In literature
Letitia Elizabeth Landon's poem,  is a reflection on a picture by Samuel Prout in Fisher's Drawing Room Scrap Book, 1833.

In popular culture

Bollywood actor and director Dev Anand wanted to shoot the song "Dil Ka Bhanwar Kare Pukar" from his film Tere Ghar Ke Samne inside the Minar. However, the cameras in that era were too big to fit inside the tower's narrow passage, and therefore the song was shot inside a replica of the Qutb Minar.

The site served as the Pit Stop of the second leg of the second series of The Amazing Race Australia.

A picture of the minaret is featured on the travel cards and tokens issued by the Delhi Metro Rail Corporation. A recently launched start-up in collaboration with the Archaeological Survey of India has made a 360o walkthrough of Qutb Minar available.

Ministry of Tourism recently gave seven companies the 'Letters of Intent' for fourteen monuments under its 'Adopt a Heritage Scheme.' These companies will be the future 'Monument Mitras.' Qutb Minar has been chosen to part of that list.

Gallery

See also
 Qutb
 Ghazni Minarets
 Firoz Minar
 Fateh Burj
 Chand Minar
 List of tallest minarets
 List of tallest structures built before the 20th century

Notes

References

External links 

 Qutub Minar 
 Archaeological Survey of India | Qutb Minar and its Monuments, Delhi
 Qutb Minar Ticket

World Heritage Sites in India
Minarets in India
Buildings and structures in Delhi
Tourist attractions in Delhi
Architecture of the Mamluk dynasty (Delhi)